Palumbia vivax is a species of hoverfly in the family Syrphidae.

Distribution
Malaysia.

References

Eristalinae
Insects described in 1975
Diptera of Asia
Taxa named by F. Christian Thompson